The 1972 Dartmouth Indians football team was an American football team that represented Dartmouth College during the 1972 NCAA University Division football season. For the fourth straight year, the Indians were Ivy League champions.

In their second season under head coach Jake Crouthamel, the Indians compiled a 7–1–1 record and outscored opponents 260 to 168. Robert Norton and Frederick Radke were the team captains.

The Indians' 5–1–1 conference record was the best in the Ivy League standings, and unlike the previous year, when Dartmouth shared the Ivy League title, in 1972 the team won the league outright. The Indians outscored Ivy opponents 219 to 147. 

Dartmouth played its home games at Memorial Field on the college campus in Hanover, New Hampshire.

Schedule

References

Dartmouth
Dartmouth Big Green football seasons
Ivy League football champion seasons
Dartmouth Indians football